Gavin Harlien (born August 20, 1999) is an American professional off-road racing driver. He has raced in the Lucas Oil Off Road Racing Series, Global RallyCross Championship, and Stadium Super Trucks. Harlien has also competed in stock car racing like the ARCA Menards Series.

Racing career
Harlien began competing in off-road racing when he was 11. In 2012, he was named Rookie of the Year in the Lucas Oil Off Road Racing Series' (LOORRS) Modified Kart class; when he moved up to  LOORRS' Pro Lite Trucks in 2014, he had won four Modified Kart races with 23 podium finishes. In the Pro Lite Trucks, he won 2014 Rookie of the Year honors with a best finish of second at Lake Elsinore Motorsports Park.

On March 30, 2014, he made his first start in the Stadium Super Trucks with a fourth-place run at St. Petersburg. In June, he competed in the series' X Games Austin 2014 round; at 14 years, he was the youngest motorized athlete in X Games history. He finished fifth in his heat race and ninth in the final. The following year, he returned to SST at X Games Austin 2015, but failed to qualify for the final after finishing fifth in his heat and failing to start the Last Chance Qualifier. 2015 also saw his debut in the Global RallyCross Championship Lites division with Tim Bell Racing.

Harlien began competing full-time in the Stadium Super Trucks in 2017. Although he failed to win a race, he finished fourth in the standings with nine podiums. In 2018, he scored his first SST win in the Grand Prix of Long Beach after taking the lead before the race was called for Apdaly Lopez's wreck. He recorded four more wins at Detroit, Texas Motor Speedway, Sydney Motorsport Park, and Glen Helen Raceway as he finished second in the championship to Matt Brabham by 50 points.

In June 2019, Harlien made his stock car racing debut in the ARCA Menards Series at World Wide Technology Raceway at Gateway, driving the No. 55 Toyota Camry for Venturini Motorsports in the first of a three-race deal. He finished eighth in the race. Harlien ran two more ARCA races in 2019 at Iowa Speedway and Salem Speedway.

After not racing in 2020 and 2021 to focus on his schooling, Harlien rejoined SST for the 2022 season opener at Long Beach. At Mid-Ohio Sports Car Course, he was the fastest qualifier and won his first race since his return, albeit in controversial fashion due to a scoring error by USAC; a runner-up finish in the next day's race allowed him to claim the weekend victory.

Personal life
Born in Austin, Harlien is a graduate of Brophy College Preparatory. He was a business major at the University of Arizona.

Motorsports career results

Stadium Super Trucks
(key) (Bold – Pole position. Italics – Fastest qualifier. * – Most laps led.)

ARCA Menards Series
(key) (Bold – Pole position awarded by qualifying time. Italics – Pole position earned by points standings or practice time. * – Most laps led.)

 Season still in progress
 Ineligible for series points

References

External links
 
 

Living people
1999 births
Sportspeople from Austin, Texas
ARCA Menards Series drivers
Stadium Super Trucks drivers
X Games athletes
University of Arizona alumni